Borlänge/Stora Tuna BK is a bandy club in Borlänge in Sweden. It was founded as Borlänge-Stora Tuna BK in 1981, when two clubs combined. The club was usually called Borlänge Bandy, until 2016, when it changed to the name Peace & Love City because of a cooperation with the Peace & Love cultural festival. The full legal name is still Ideella föreningen Borlänge-Stora Tuna Bandyklubb med firma Borlänge-Stora Tuna BK. Since  2019, the club is again called Borlänge/Stora Tuna BK.

The club has been playing in the second level league of Swedish bandy, Allsvenskan, in the 2010/11 season and again since the 2012/13 season.

Borlänge Bandy has a cooperation agreement with the Somalia national bandy team. The latter team was created by Somali expats living in Borlänge and the well-known Borlänge Bandy coach Per Fosshaug is their head coach.

References

External links
 http://www.borlangebandy.se

Bandy clubs in Sweden
Bandy clubs established in 1981
1981 establishments in Sweden
Sport in Borlänge